Rutherford County Courthouse is a historic courthouse located at Rutherfordton, Rutherford County, North Carolina.  It was designed by architect Louis H. Asbury and built in 1925–1926.  It is a two-story, Renaissance Revival style building faced with a smooth stone veneer.  The front facade features a hexastyle portico in antis.

It was added to the National Register of Historic Places in 1979. It is located in the Main Street Historic District.

References

County courthouses in North Carolina
Courthouses on the National Register of Historic Places in North Carolina
Renaissance Revival architecture in North Carolina
Government buildings completed in 1925
Buildings and structures in Rutherford County, North Carolina
National Register of Historic Places in Rutherford County, North Carolina
Historic district contributing properties in North Carolina
Rutherfordton, North Carolina